The  Houston Oilers season was the 31st season and their 21st in the National Football League (NFL). The Oilers scored 405 points which ranked second in the AFC and second overall in the NFL. Their defense gave up 307 points. During the season, the Oilers appeared once on Monday Night Football and defeated the Buffalo Bills. On December 16, 1990, Warren Moon threw for 527 yards in a game against the Kansas City Chiefs. Moon was part of the Oilers "Run and shoot" era. The run and shoot offense also incorporated teammates Ernest Givens, Drew Hill, Haywood Jeffires and Curtis Duncan. The 1990 season saw the Oilers appear in the playoffs for the fourth consecutive season. They finished tied for first in the AFC Central with the Cincinnati Bengals and Pittsburgh Steelers, as all three teams finished with identical 9–7 records. The Bengals would be awarded the division title by having a better division record than Houston or Pittsburgh. The Oilers would win the tiebreaker over the Steelers by having a better division record than them. The Oilers finished the season 9–7 and clinched a wild card spot. However, they would have to play their playoff game without Moon, who dislocated his thumb two weeks before the season ended when he hit his thumb on the helmet of defender James Francis. Cody Carlson was tapped to start in what became his only career playoff start. In the wild card game, they were embarrassed by the Bengals 41–14, ending Houston's season in a flash.

Offseason

NFL draft

Personnel

Staff

Roster

Regular season

Schedule 

Note: Intra-division opponents are in bold text.

Standings

Playoffs

AFC Wild Card

Awards and records 
 Ray Childress, 1990 AFC Pro Bowl selection
 Ernest Givins, Pro Bowl selection
 Drew Hill, Ranked second in AFC in receptions
 Haywood Jeffires, Led AFC in Receptions
 Warren Moon, NFL leader, passing yards (4,689)
 Warren Moon, Pro Bowl selection
 Warren Moon, All-Pro selection (1990)
 Warren Moon, NEA NFL MVP
 Warren Moon, NFL Offensive Player of the Year
 Warren Moon, UPI AFL-AFC Player of the Year
 Warren Moon, Houston Oilers record, most passing yards in one game (527)

Milestones 
 Haywood Jeffires – 1st 1,000 Yard Receiving Season (1,048 yards)
 Drew Hill – 4th 1,000 Yard Receiving Season (1,019 yards)
 Warren Moon, 2nd 400 Yard Passing Game (527)

References

External links 
 1990 Houston Oilers at Pro-Football-Reference.com

Houston Oilers
Houston Oilers seasons
Houston